Mayors of Passaic, New Jersey
Most recent first:

 Hector Carlos Lora, 2016 to present (interim mayor, November 17, 2016; elected to regular term May 9, 2017)
 Alex Blanco, November 2008 to the day he pleaded guilty and was convicted on federal bribery charges (November 17, 2016)
 Gary Schaer (acting mayor, unelected), May 2008 to November 2008
 Samuel Rivera (1946–2020), July 1, 2001 to the day he pleaded guilty and was convicted on federal bribery charges (May 9, 2008)
 Marge Semler (1923–2015), May 12, 1993 to June 30, 2001
 Joseph Lipari, 1983 to 1993 (federal tax and conspiracy conviction) 
 Robert C. Hare (1914–2010), 1978 to 1983 
 Gerald Goldman, 1971 to 1978
 Bernard E. Pinck (1917–1981), 1967 to 1971 
Paul G. DeMuro: 1960 to 1967; note: 2nd of 2 periods in office (see below, 1948)
Gap between 1955 and 1960
 Morris Pashman (1912–1999), 1951 to 1955
 Paul G. DeMuro, 1948 to 1951; note: 1st of 2 periods in office (see above, 1960 )
 Nicholas Martini (1904–1991), 1943 to 1947 
Gap between 1930 and 1943
 Benjamin Franklin Turner, Sr.,  
Gap between 1919 and 1930
 George Nicholas Seger (1866–1940), September 26, 1911 (at noon) to 1919 
 Bird W. Spencer, 1910 to 1911, when form of government changed; note: 2nd of 2 periods in office (see below, 1879)
 Frederick Low, 1908 to 1909
 David Greenlie, 1904 to 1907
 Gap between 1899 and 1904
 Charles Moffat Howe (1851–1920),   (conflicting information with McLean)
 Andrew McLean, 1887 to November 1899 (conflicting information with Howe)
 John Willet, April 1885 to 1887
 Bird W. Spencer, 1879 to April, 1885; note: 1st of 2 periods in office (see above, 1910)
 Gap before 1879

References

 
Passaic, New Jersey